The Minister of Correctional Services was a minister in the government of South Africa, who was responsible for overseeing the Department of Correctional Services. The ministry existed between 1990 and 2014 – it was known before 1994 as the Ministry of Prisons – and has now been subsumed under the Minister of Justice and Correctional Services. Before 1990, correctional services were administered within the Ministry of Justice; a separate department and ministerial portfolio were established only when extensive prison reforms were announced in the early 1990s, under the cabinet of F.W. de Klerk. In July 2014, at the beginning of the second Zuma cabinet, the portfolios were merged again, creating the Ministry of Justice and Correctional Services, which now has a dedicated Deputy Minister of Correctional Services and which oversees the Department of Correctional Services.

List of Ministers

Ministry of Prisons (1991–1994)

Ministry of Correctional Services (1994–2014)

References

External links
Ministry of Correctional Services
Department of Correctional Services

Correctional Services
 
South Africa
Lists of political office-holders in South Africa